The FondaMental foundation is a French scientific research foundation, established in 2007 to promote collaborative medical research in the field of mental health.

Name

History

By 2011, it had established eight mental health expert centers within existing hospital facilities in Créteil, Paris, Versailles, Bordeaux, Nancy, Montpellier, Grenoble, and Marseille. By 2017, the number of FondaMental-supported expert centers had grown to 43: 12 on bipolar disorder, 10 on schizophrenia, 8 on high-functioning autism, and 13 on treatment-resistant depression.

Operations and organization

FondaMental fosters mental health care and frontier research on mental health science, with an emphasis on multidisciplinary approaches. It also conducts initiatives in the areas of medical and scientific training, public education, and policy advocacy in relation with mental health, mostly in France.

Its main governing body is a Board of directors, chaired as of mid-2022 by David de Rothschild. The foundation's CEO since its creation has been prominent mental health scientist and practitioner Marion Leboyer. Its Director of Research is Pierre-Michel Llorca.

See also
 Mental Health Foundation
 Foundation for People with Learning Disabilities
 American Mental Health Foundation
 World Federation for Mental Health

Notes

Foundations based in France
Mental health organizations
Mental health in France